Jeannie Chan (born October 22, 1989) is a Canadian-born Hong Kong actress and model. She is currently signed to Shaw Brothers management and has an artiste contract with TVB.

Early life 
Jeannie Chan was born in Toronto, Ontario, but moved to Vancouver at a young age. She and her older sister were raised by her grandmother. She also has a younger half-brother. She graduated from University of British Columbia with a Bachelor of Business Administration, being an exchange student in City University of Hong Kong for a year.

Personal life

Friendship 
Chan is best friends with Stephanie Ho and Moon Lau as they became close when filming the drama Raising The Bar in 2014. She also shared an apartment with Stephanie Ho for a year (2015-2016). She is also good friends with Winki Lai, Kandy Wong, Annice Ng, Cheronna Ng, Anjaylia Chan and Venus Wong from filming the drama Never Dance Alone, they are known as 'M Club'. In 2020, Chan, along with Stephanie Ho, Winki Lai, Sisley Choi, Anjaylia Chan and Cheronna Ng, named their friendship group 'SÏXTERS'. She also become good friends with Kalok Chow, Brian Chu and Joey Wong after filming the drama Your Highness in 2021, naming their friendship group 'SSFN'.

She also has three dogs, Diesel, Baymax and Kumo.

Relationship 
In December 2015, Chan admitted that she had been dating Arnaldo Ho, the son of Macau casino tycoon Stanley Ho, but announced their break up in July 2016.

Career

Modelling 
Jeannie Chan became a model when she was an exchange student in Hong Kong and later joined the modelling agency Starzpeople. Since then, she had been appeared in numerous Hong Kong advertisements, usually working with skin care, makeup and fashion brands. Chan released her own photo book Half-Transparent Dancer (半透明的舞孃) on 21 August 2015. In 2018, she concluded her contract with Starzpeople as she wanted to focus on acting.

Acting 
In 2013, Chan signed a preliminary contract with TVB and began to act in dramas. In 2014, she starred in her first TVB drama 'Never Dance Alone' as the teen version of Yung Dan Dan. In 2015, Chan got her first major role in the drama Raising The Bar and garnered her first Best Supporting Actress nomination at the 2015 TVB Anniversary Awards.

In 2017, Chan starred in the drama The No No Girl, which rose her to popularity and she is often referred to as "goddess"(女神) by the media. With her role in the drama, she received multiple nominations, including Best Supporting Actress and Most Improved Female Artiste. Chan also filmed a short comedy for the drama named Bad Hotel Guest, which achieved 1.3M+ views and received a Finalist Certificate from the New York Film Festival. 

In early 2018, Chan guest starred in the drama The Forgotten Valley. Despite her short screen time, her performance was praised by viewers as she had to experience uncomfortable times during filming. On 21 March 2018, she signed a 5-year artiste management contract with Shaw Brothers. In October 2018, Chan starred in the drama Life on the Line, in which she was praised for doing multiple crying scenes well.

In February 2019, Chan starred in drama The Ghetto-Fabulous Lady and was praised for her improvement in acting. In April 2019, her first drama as the first female lead, 'ICAC Investigators 2019', was aired. In January 2020, Chan starred as the second female lead in the drama Of Greed and Ants, earning her first Best Actress and Most Popular Female Character nominations at the 2020 TVB Anniversary Awards.

Business 
In March 2017, Jeannie and her best friend, Anna, established an online jewellery brand called, Onliest & Co. She advertised her jewellery through Instagram posts, attracting worldwide customers. In December, they launched a HMV flagship store in Causeway Bay.

Television commercials
 2010 Pizza Hut: Commercial for new menu item
 2010 Standard Chartered Bank: New plan
 2011 1-Day ACUVUE Moist
 2011 Hong Kong Disneyland TV Commercial
 2011 Lee Kum Kee TVC
 2013 Citibank: Credit card ad

Filmography

Television Dramas

TVB

Shaw Brothers

Host

Film

Awards and nominations

Starhub TVB Awards

TVB Star Awards Malaysia

TVB Anniversary Awards

People's Choice Television Awards

AEG Entertainment Awards

Yahoo Asia Buzz Awards

References

External links
 Jeannie's Tumblr blog
 Jeannie's Official Facebook Page
 Jeannie's Instagram
 Jeannie's Weibo
 

1989 births
Living people
Female models from Ontario
Hong Kong film actresses
Hong Kong female models
Hong Kong television actresses
Actresses from Toronto
Canadian actresses of Hong Kong descent
TVB actors
UBC Sauder School of Business alumni
21st-century Canadian actresses
Canadian-born Hong Kong artists